Pascal Lalle (born 25 October 1956) is a French superintendent of the National Police. He has been Director of Active Services at the Central Directorate of Public Security since 19 July 2012.

Biography 
After completing his studies at Sciences Po Aix, Lalle attended the École Nationale Supérieure de la Police, from which he graduated in 1980.

Lalle worked in Strasbourg, Nîmes, Bobigny and Saint-Etienne, as well as in Madagascar and in Burundi. From 2008 to 2012, he was Departmental Director for Public Security in Marseille.

On 9 September 2010, while in office in Marseille, he was promoted to the rank of Inspector General for Active Services. He rose to Director of the Active Services on 19 July 2012.

Honours 
 Knight of the Legion of Honour
 Knight of the National Order of Merit
 Knight of the Ordre des Palmes Académiques
 Honour medal of the National Police

Notes and references 

1956 births
National Police (France)
Chevaliers of the Légion d'honneur
Living people